The Fremont, Elkhorn and Missouri Valley Railroad Depot (also known as the Chicago and Northwestern Railroad Depot) is a historic train station on South Main Street in Plainview, Pierce County, Nebraska. Built in 1880, it was listed on the National Register of Historic Places in 2005.  In 2009, it was serving as the Plainview Historical Museum.

It was built to serve the Fremont, Elkhorn and Missouri Valley Railroad, which was later absorbed into the Chicago and Northwestern Railroad. No tracks remain in the vicinity of the depot building.

It is a two-story gabled wood-frame building with a brick facade on a concrete foundation, with a  plan.

See also
Fremont, Elkhorn and Missouri Valley Railroad Depot (Dwight, Nebraska), also NRHP-listed

References

External links

 Plainview Historical Museum – Plainview Historical Society

Railway stations on the National Register of Historic Places in Nebraska
Railway stations in the United States opened in 1880
National Register of Historic Places in Pierce County, Nebraska
Museums in Pierce County, Nebraska
Plainview
Former railway stations in Nebraska